Goniobranchus multimaculosus is a species of colourful sea slug, a dorid nudibranch, a marine gastropod mollusc in the family Chromodorididae. This species was transferred from Chromodoris to Goniobranchus in 2012.

Distribution
This marine species was described from northern Tasmania.

Description
Goniobranchus multimaculosus is a chromodorid nudibranch with a pink, spotted mantle. The middle of the mantle is pink with fine white specks and an irregular scattering of bright red spots and the margin is white with large orange spots.

References

Chromodorididae
Gastropods described in 1987